Caelum  is a faint constellation in the southern sky, introduced in the 1750s by Nicolas Louis de Lacaille and counted among the 88 modern constellations. Its name means “chisel” in Latin, and it was formerly known as Caelum Sculptorium (“the engravers’ chisel”); It is a rare word, unrelated to the far more common Latin caelum, meaning “sky, heaven, atmosphere”. It is the eighth-smallest constellation, and subtends a solid angle of around 0.038 steradians, just less than that of Corona Australis.

Due to its small size and location away from the plane of the Milky Way, Caelum is a rather barren constellation, with few objects of interest. The constellation's brightest star, Alpha Caeli, is only of magnitude 4.45, and only one other star, (Gamma) γ 1 Caeli, is brighter than magnitude 5 .

History 
Caelum was incepted as one of fourteen southern constellations in the 18th century by Nicolas Louis de Lacaille, a French astronomer and celebrater of the Age of Enlightenment.
It retains its name Burin among French speakers, latinized in his catalogue of 1763 as Caelum Sculptoris (“Engraver's Chisel”).

Francis Baily shortened this name to Caelum, as suggested by John Herschel. In Lacaille's original chart, it was shown as a pair of engraver's tools: a standard burin and more specific shape-forming échoppe tied by a ribbon, but came to be ascribed a simple chisel. Johann Elert Bode stated the name as plural with a singular possessor, Caela Scalptoris – in German (die ) Grabstichel (“the Engraver’s Chisels”) – but this did not stick.

Characteristics 
Caelum is bordered by Dorado and Pictor to the south, Horologium and Eridanus to the east, Lepus to the north, and Columba to the west. Covering only 125 square degrees, it ranks 81st of the 88 modern constellations in size.

Its main asterism consists of four stars, and twenty stars in total are brighter than magnitude 6.5 .

The constellation's boundaries, as set by Belgian astronomer Eugène Delporte in 1930, are a 12-sided polygon. The International Astronomical Union (IAU) adopted the three-letter abbreviation “Cae” for the constellation in 1922.

Its main stars are visible in favourable conditions and with a clear southern horizon, for part of the year as far as about the 41st parallel north

These stars avoid being engulfed by daylight for some of every day (when above the horizon) to viewers in mid- and well-inhabited higher latitudes of the Southern Hemisphere. Caelum shares with (to the north) Taurus, Eridanus and Orion midnight culmination in December (high summer), resulting in this fact.  In winter (such as June) the constellation can be observed sufficiently inset from the horizons during its rising before dawn and/or setting after dusk as it culminates then at around mid-day, well above the sun.  In South Africa, Argentina, their sub-tropical neighbouring areas and some of Australia in high June the key stars may be traced before dawn in the east; near the equator the stars lose night potential in May to June; they ill-compete with the Sun in northern tropics and sub-tropics from late February to mid-September with March being unfavorable as to post-sunset due to the light of the Milky Way.

Notable features

Stars 

Caelum is a faint constellation: It has no star brighter than magnitude 4 and only two stars brighter than magnitude 5.

Lacaille gave six stars Bayer designations, labeling them Alpha (α ) to Zeta (ζ ) in 1756, but omitted Epsilon (ε ) and designated two adjacent stars as Gamma (γ ). Bode extended the designations to Rho (ρ ) for other stars, but most of these have fallen out of use. Caelum is too far south for any of its stars to bear Flamsteed designations.

The brightest star, (Alpha) α Caeli, is a double star, containing an F-type main-sequence star of magnitude 4.45 and a red dwarf of magnitude 12.5 ,  from Earth. Unlike α, β Caeli is a subgiant star, slightly evolved from the main sequence.

(Gamma) γ 1 Caeli is a double-star with a red giant primary of magnitude 4.58 and a secondary of magnitude 8.1 . The two components are difficult to resolve with small amateur telescopes because of their difference in visual magnitude and their close separation. These are a class of short-period (six hours at most) pulsating stars that have been used as standard candles and as subjects to study astroseismology. X Caeli itself is also a binary star, specifically a contact binary, meaning that the stars are so close that they share envelopes. The only other variable star in Caelum visible to the naked eye is RV Caeli, a pulsating red giant of spectral type M1III, which varies between magnitudes 6.44 and 6.56 .

Three other stars in Caelum are still occasionally referred to by their Bayer designations, although they are only on the edge of naked-eye visibility. (Nu) ν Caeli is another double star, containing a white giant of magnitude 6.07 and a star of magnitude 10.66, with unknown spectral type. (Zeta) ζ Caeli is even fainter, being only of magnitude 6.36 . The other twelve naked-eye stars in Caelum are not referred to by Bode's Bayer designations anymore, including RV Caeli.

This star system consists of a dim red dwarf and a white dwarf. Despite its closeness to the Earth, the system's apparent magnitude is only 14.40 due to the faintness of its components, and thus it cannot be easily seen with amateur equipment. In 2012, the system was found to contain a giant planet, and there is evidence for a second substellar body. The system is a post-common-envelope binary and is losing angular momentum over time, which will eventually cause mass transfer from the red dwarf to the white dwarf. In approximately 9–20 billion years, this will cause the system to become a cataclysmic variable.

Deep-sky objects 
Due to its small size and location away from the plane of the Milky Way, Caelum is rather devoid of deep-sky objects, and contains no Messier objects. The only deep-sky object in Caelum to receive much attention is HE0450-2958, an unusual Seyfert galaxy. Originally, the jet's host galaxy proved elusive to find, and this jet appeared to be emanating from nothing. Although it has been suggested that the object is an ejected supermassive black hole, the host is now agreed to be a small galaxy that is difficult to see due to light from the jet and a nearby starburst galaxy.

The 13th magnitude planetary nebula PN G243-37.1 is also in the eastern regions of the constellation. It is one of only a few planetary nebulae found in the galactic halo, being  light-years below the Milky Way's 1000 light-year-thick disk.

Galaxies NGC 1595, NGC 1598, and the Carafe galaxy are known as the Carafe group. The Carafe galaxy is a Seyfert galaxy with ring. Its location is 4:28 / -47°54' (2000.0).

Notes

References

External links 

 Starry Night Photography – Caelum Constellation

 
Southern constellations
Constellations listed by Lacaille